Lilyturf may refer to two closely related genera of flowering plants:

Liriope
Ophiopogon